Ándalus Líneas Aéreas operated the following services as of July 2010 prior to closure:

Africa
Morocco
Casablanca - Mohammed V International Airport
Marrakech - Marrakech-Menara Airport
Nador - Nador International Airport Hub

Europe
 Gibraltar
Gibraltar - Gibraltar International Airport
Spain
Barcelona - Barcelona Airport Hub
Girona - Girona Airport
Málaga - Málaga Airport Main Base
Palma de Mallorca - Palma de Mallorca Airport

External links 
Ándalus Líneas Aéreas

References 

Lists of airline destinations